This is a list of cities in Liberia:

Arthington
Barclayville
Bensonville
Brewerville
Bopolu
Buchanan
Buutuo
Caldwell
Careysburg
Clay-Ashland
Edina
Fish Town
Ganta
Gbarnga
Greenville
Harbel
Harper
Kakata
Monrovia (capital)
Marshall
Paynesville
Pleebo
River Cess
Robertsport
Sacleipea
Sanniquellie
Tubmanburg
Tuzon
Virginia
Voinjama
Yekepa
Zorzor
Zwedru

References 

Liberia, List of cities in
Liberia
Cities